De La Salle College is a co-educational (from 2023 onwards) state secondary school in Churchtown, Dublin 14, in Ireland. It is a non-fee paying school which has educational facilities to cater for about 500 pupils. The school was officially opened in 1952 and moved to its present location in 1957. Since then, the college was extended in 1986 and 1997 to cater for the increase in the number of pupils. De La Salle College Churchtown is a member of Le Cheile Schools Trust.

The Brothers of De La Salle are the trustees of the college and it is under the control of a board of management. Siobhán Foster is the principal. There are approximately 35 teachers.

Sports
De La Salle College Churchtown won the Leinster Senior Schools Rugby Cup in 1983 and 1985.

Notable alumni
Dermot Keely, Former football player and manager. Former teacher
John Kavanagh, UFC Coach 
John Carney, musician and director of the Oscar-winning film Once
Damien Duff, footballer with the Ireland national team (retired) and Chelsea in the Premier League
Brian Stynes, Gaelic footballer
Jim Stynes, Australian rules footballer 
 Tom Vaughan-Lawlor, Actor Love/Hate
 Brian Jennings, RTÉ Newsreader
 Des Fitzgerald, Ireland rugby international, Father of Luke Fitzgerald.
Niyi Adeolokun, former Connacht rugby player

References

External links
Official website
"Pupils had to resit English and maths after theft 40 years ago"
Alaa Ciymeh

Secondary schools in Dún Laoghaire–Rathdown
Dublin
1952 establishments in Ireland
Educational institutions established in 1952